Bruce H. Lipshutz (born 1951) is an American chemist. He is a professor at the University of California, Santa Barbara.

Biography
Lipshutz received his undergraduate degree in chemistry from Binghamton University in 1973. His graduate work was supervised by Harry H. Wasserman at Yale.  After a PhD degree in 1977, he spent two years at Harvard as a post-doctoral researcher in the group of Nobel Laureate E. J. Corey. Soon after, he accepted a position of Assistant Professor at UCSB rising to the ranks of Professor in 1987. He has received the Alfred P. Sloan Foundation Fellowship and the Camille & Henry Dreyfus Teacher-Scholar Award. In 2011 he was awarded Presidential Green Chemistry Award.  He is Co-founder of Zymes LLC.

Contributions

Reagents
Aqueous Micellar Catalysis using TPGS-750-M and Nok.
Sustainable Palladium catalysis.
2-(Trimethylsilyl)ethoxymethyl chloride: hydroxyl protecting group, selectively cleaved with fluoride ion under mild conditions.
 Di-(4-chlorobenzyl)azodicarboxylate (DCAD): recyclable and convenient alternative to diethyl azodicarboxylate (DEAD) or diisopropyl azodicarboxylate (DIAD) in Mitsunobu reaction.
Ligated copper hydride.
Heterogeneous catalysts: nickel-on-charcoal, copper-on-charcoal, nickel-in-graphite, copper+nickel-on-charcoal.

Methodologies
Higher-order organocuprates (Lipshutz cuprates).
Chiral and achiral conjugate reductions.
Catalyst development for ppm Pd-catalyzed C-C couplings in water at ambient
Use of nonionic amphiphiles for transition metal-mediated cross coupling in organic synthesis.
 Low-cost synthesis of Coenzyme Q10.

References

1951 births
Living people
21st-century American chemists
Yale University alumni
Harvard University staff
University of California, Santa Barbara faculty
Binghamton University alumni